Apiomerus longispinis is a species of assassin bug in the family Reduviidae. It is found in Central America and North America.

References

Further reading

 

longispinis
Articles created by Qbugbot
Insects described in 1899
Hemiptera of North America